Psectrotarsia flava is a species of moth of the family Noctuidae. It is found in Peru, west of the Andes.

The length of the forewings is 12.9–13.3 mm.

External links
 Species info Revision of the Genus Psectrotarsia Dognin, 1907 (Lepidoptera: Noctuidae: Heliothinae)

Heliothinae